Natasha St-Pier (born 10 February 1981) is a Canadian singer of Acadian origin who has spent most of her career in France. She was coach in the second and third season of The Voice Belgique (The Voice of Belgium).

Career
Natasha St-Pier released her first album, Emergence, in 1996, produced by composer/producer Steve Barakatt. In 2000, she made her international singing debut as Fleur-de-Lys in the London version of the musical drama Notre Dame de Paris.

She came fourth in the 2001 Eurovision Song Contest in Copenhagen, representing France with the power ballad Je n'ai que mon âme, later releasing an English version of the song: "All I Have Is My Soul". By 2010, she had released 7 albums, topped the French album and singles charts, and made it to the top 10 of the Eurochart Hot 100. St Pier has become popular in francophone Europe, and in countries such as Poland and Russia. Her seventh album, Tu Trouveras: 10 Ans De Succès, which is largely a "Best of" compilation of her songs previously recorded, was released in November 2009. During 2010 she toured Canada, Belgium and France.

In 2004, Sony Music France released a Natasha St-Pier DVD, Un Instant Avec Natasha St-Pier, that included a video tour diary, a personal video dictionary, and seven music videos.

On 9 March 2012, she married her boyfriend of a year and a half, Gregory Quillacq, a Parisian fireman, at a private ceremony in Lit-et-Mixe.

Since September 2013, Natasha is the host of the television show "Les chansons d'abord" (Songs First) to France 3. She was also one of the commentators of the Eurovision Song Contest 2014 for French television. In October 2015 St-Pier, signed to the Smart label, released the album Mon Acadie, a collection of covers of traditional folk songs.

Private life 
In 2012, she married Grégory Quillacq (a member of the aquatic and subaquatic fire brigade of Paris), she has a child named Bixente Maxime, who underwent a successful heart operation. She is a dietitian, vegetarian and a Christian (Catholic). She is also a yoga teacher and an occasional scuba diver. In 2021 she announced she and her husband were separated.

Discography

Albums 

Studio albums

Rereleases / Compilations

Singles

Featured in

References

External links

  
 
 Biography of Natasha St-Pier, from Radio France Internationale
 Private fanpage

1981 births
Acadian people
Eurovision Song Contest entrants for France
Eurovision Song Contest entrants of 2001
French-language singers of Canada
Canadian expatriates in France
Living people
Musicians from Bathurst, New Brunswick
Musicians from Edmundston
Spanish-language singers of Canada
Canadian women pop singers
20th-century Canadian women singers
21st-century Canadian women singers
Canadian Roman Catholics